Puryŏng County is a kun, or county, in North Hamgyŏng province, North Korea.

Geography
Most of the county is mountainous, being traversed by the Hamgyŏng Range and its outlying spurs. The highest point is Kosŏngsan (Chosŏn'gŭl: 고성산, Hancha: 姑城山), 1,754 meters above sea level. Many other high peaks are also found in the county. The chief stream is the Susŏngch'ŏn (Chosŏn'gŭl: 수성천. Hancha: 輸城川).

90% of the county is forested. Rare mammals inhabit the area, including the marten, brown bear, and Amur leopard.  The climate is affected by both maritime and continental influences.

Administrative divisions
Puryŏng County is divided into 1 ŭp (town), 3 rodongjagu (workers' districts) and 5 ri (villages):

Economy
The local economy is dominated by metalworking, mining, and electric power. Deposits of gold, copper, quartzite, and limestone are found in the county. The intermontane valleys are home to grain farms where corn, soybeans, rice, wheat, barley, proso millet, and millet are harvested. Rice fields make up 2% of the county's area.  Sericulture is also practiced.

Transportation
Puryŏng lies on the Hambuk and Musan lines of the Korean State Railway, and is also served by roads.

History
Puryŏng was one of the six post/garrisons established under the order of Sejong the Great of Chosŏn (1418–1450) to safeguard his people from the hostile Chinese and Manchurian nomads living in Manchuria.

Notables personalities
Ri Chi-si, the prefect of Puryŏng

See also
Geography of North Korea
Administrative divisions of North Korea

External links
Location of the four forts and the six posts

Counties of North Hamgyong